The Lely Venus is a marble statue of the crouching Venus type. It is a copy of a Hellenistic original by Doidalses of Bithynia and dates from the Antonine period.

History 

The statue is first recorded in the Gonzaga collection in Mantua, where it was inventoried in the Gonzaga collection in 1627  Whilst there it was seen by Peter Paul Rubens, who stayed with the Gonzaga family whilst on the continent on diplomatic and art-collecting duties for Charles I of England.  It was an important influence on his voluptuous style of painting the female nude, so much so that it appeared at the National Gallery's "Rubens: A Master in the Making" exhibition from 26 October 2005 to 15 January 2006

It was soon purchased from the Gonzagas, in 1627–28, for Charles I of England,  It was remarked in England in 1631 as "the finest statue of all" and valued at 6000 ecus.  On the dispersal of Charles's art collections during the Commonwealth, it came into the possession of the painter and connoisseur Sir Peter Lely, from whom it derives its name.   Two years after Lely's death (1682), it was re-acquired from his collection for the Royal Collection.  The statue was stolen from the Palace of Whitehall after it was destroyed by fire on January 4, 1698, and was recovered four years later by the Crown.

Since 2005 it has been on long-term loan to British Museum, following treatment by their conservators, and is currently on display in gallery 23.

Notes

Paul F. Norton, The Lost Sleeping Cupid of Michelangelo, The Art Bulletin, Vol. 39, No. 4 (Dec., 1957), pp. 251–257
Anne H. van Buren, Erica Cruikshank Dodd, Ellen N. Davis, Clifford M. Brown, Letters to the Editor, The Art Bulletin, Vol. 57, No. 3 (Sep., 1975), pp. 466–467

Crouching Venuses
2nd-century Roman sculptures
Sculptures of the Royal Collection of the United Kingdom
Roman copies of Greek sculptures
Marble sculptures in the United Kingdom
Archaeological discoveries in Italy
Gonzaga art collection